Milanovac may refer to:

 Milanovac, Žagubica, a village in Braničevo, Serbia
 Milanovac, Virovitica, a village near the city of Virovitica, Croatia
 Milanovac, Crnac, a village near Crnac, Virovitica-Podravina County, Croatia
 Milanovac, Požega-Slavonia County, a village near Velika, Croatia
 Gornji Milanovac, a town in central Serbia
 Donji Milanovac, a town in eastern Serbia
 Novi Milanovac, a village in central Serbia